Etsuro Sotoo (外尾悦郎, born 1953 in Fukuoka Prefecture) is a Japanese sculptor strongly influenced by Antoni Gaudí. His interest in Gaudí led him to convert to the Roman Catholic Church. His most noted work are sculptures located in the Sagrada Familia in Barcelona.

Biography

In 1978 Etsuro Sotoo visited Barcelona and was impressed by the Sagrada Familia. He worked as a stone-cutter and has been working since then on sculptures for the building, following the instructions left by Antoni Gaudí. At first he worked on the Nativity Façade. Among other figures there were sculptures of angels, musicians and singers, children, as well as the fruit baskets crowning the pinnacles of the temple.

He has also designed the doors installed on the Nativity facade (inaugurated in December 2015 after many years of work), made of bronze and glass, decorated with plants, insects and small animals. He has made four gargoyles to be installed in the towers of the Evangelists, currently under construction. In addition, Sotoo was commissioned to restore the sculptures of the Porta del Rosari, damaged in the Spanish Civil War. He also worked on the design of tubular bells installed in Gaudí thought bell towers of the three facades of the Sagrada Familia.

He is also author of a monument commemorating the 150th anniversary of the signature Louis Vuitton in Barbera del Valles (2004) and Memorial Angel Lace (2003) in Arenys de Munt and sculpture of Josemaria Escriva de Balaguer (2004) in the Montalegre church for Barcelona.

In Japan, author of Birth (1985) and The Old Man and the Girl (1988) in the Art Museum Chohachi Matsuzaki and sculptures Pineapples (1993) at the Stadium of Fukuoka and Five Elements (1997) at the Institute of Fukuoka monument of 1500 m² dedicated to water, the wind, the sky, fire and earth. Sotoo was a visiting professor of Kyushu University User Science Institute, School of Engineering Main Building and ambassador of Kesennuma, Rias Sanriku (Japan). He was also vice president of the Nipon Center of Canet de Mar.

Trivia
 In his native Japan he is nicknamed the "Japanese Gaudí".

References 
Sotoo Etsuro (2010). Vertical Freedom. Conversations on the Sagrada Familia. .

External links

 "Etsuro Sotoo: Master sculptor in Spain found calling in a pile of rocks", Joji Sakurai, The Japan Times, 1 April 2017.
Interview
Etsuro Sotoo will rebuild the Gaudi's Pedrera main esculpture

Converts to Roman Catholicism
Japanese Roman Catholics
Kyoto City University of Arts alumni
Artists from Fukuoka Prefecture
1953 births
Living people
Catholic sculptors